Raafat Attia (6 February 1934 – 21 July 1978) was an Egyptian footballer who played as a forward for Al Ittihad Alexandria and Zamalek. He also managed Saudi Arabian club Al-Wehda in 1976. He also played for the Egyptian national team, and was part of the team that won the 1957 Africa Cup of Nations where he scored the first goal ever at the Africa Cup of Nations, and represented his country in the 1960 and 1964 Summer Olympics.

Honours
Zamalek
 Egyptian Premier League: 1959–60, 1963–64, 1964–65
 Egypt Cup : 1957–58, 1958–59, 1959–60, 1961–62

Egypt
 Africa Cup of Nations: 1957

References

External links
 Profile at FIFA.com
 

1934 births
1978 deaths
Egyptian footballers
Association football forwards
Egypt international footballers
Zamalek SC players
Olympic footballers of Egypt
Footballers at the 1960 Summer Olympics
Footballers at the 1964 Summer Olympics
1957 African Cup of Nations players
1962 African Cup of Nations players
Africa Cup of Nations-winning players
Egyptian Premier League players
Al-Wehda Club (Mecca) managers
Egyptian football managers
Egyptian expatriate football managers
Egyptian expatriate sportspeople in Saudi Arabia
Expatriate football managers in Saudi Arabia